Sadabad-e Sofla (also Romanized as Sa‘dābād-e Soflá; also known as Sa‘dābād) is a village in Howmeh Rural District, in the Central District of Bam County, Kerman Province, Iran. At the 2006 census, its population was 27, in 10 families.

References 

Populated places in Bam County